Emma Robarts (died 1 May 1877) was a British Christian activist who formed a group known as the Prayer Union. The organisation combined in 1877 with an organisation created by Mary Jane Kinnaird to form the Young Women's Christian Association.

History

Robarts was the daughter of Nathaniel Robarts, a London woollen draper, and was one of six daughters, five of whom remained unmarried and lived together in Barnet, Hertfordshire. In 1855 she decided to form a group who could pray for other women. The first group consisted of 23 Christian women who met in Barnet in Middlesex. The idea of offering prayers was popular and within four years there were brackets throughout the United Kingdom. Robarts intended to appeal to all classes of women in order that their combined prayers could provide for the "eternal salvation" of other young women. The group had initially called themselves the "Young Women's Christian Association" echoing the YMCA which had been formed in 1844, however in 1855 they settled on the name of the "Prayer Union". By 1872 there were 130 branches in Britain supplying bible study, group prayer and social events. There were a few places where women could stay.

Robarts met Mary Jane Kinnaird who had also created an organisation in 1855 to provide accommodation for nurses travelling to and from the Crimean War but which had widened its base to provide housing for Christian women. They merged their organisations to form what would become the Young Women's Christian Association. The founding date of the YWCA has been given as 1876 or 1877. Kinnaird and Robarts had met in 1876 and an agreement was made in January 1877. Robarts died on 1 May 1877 before the merger was announced at the end of the year that created "The London Young Women's Institute Union and Christian Association".

References

1877 deaths
People from the London Borough of Barnet
Evangelists
YWCA leaders
Christianity and women